The 1985 Colorado Buffaloes football team represented the University of Colorado in the Big Eight Conference during the 1985 NCAA Division I-A football season. Led by fourth-year head coach Bill McCartney, the Buffaloes switched to a wishbone offense and finished the regular season at 7–4 (4–3 in Big 8, tied for third). Home games were played on campus at Folsom Field in Boulder, Colorado.

Colorado, 1–10 the previous season, won five of its first six games, earned its first bowl invitation in nine years, and won the NCAA Most Improved Team Award. In a competitive Freedom Bowl in late December, CU fell to the favored Washington Huskies by three points in Anaheim; both teams finished at 7–5.

Schedule

Game summaries

Kansas

COL - Mickey Pruitt 27-yard interception return (Larry Eckel kick)
KAN - Jeff Johnson 36-yard field goal
COL - Mark Hatcher 5-yard run (Eckel kick)
Attendance: 25,000

Passing: COL Mark Hatcher 1/6, 11 yds; KAN Mike Norseth 22/41, 256 yds, INT
Rushing: COL Anthony Weatherspoon 16–65; KAN Harvey Fields 7–24
Receiving: COL Sam Smith 1–11; KAN Richard Estell 8–126

References

External links
University of Colorado Athletics – 1985 football roster
Sports-Reference – 1985 Colorado Buffaloes

Colorado
Colorado Buffaloes football seasons
Colorado Buffaloes football